Alexandre Bardenet (born 26 May 1990) is a French right-handed épée fencer, two-time team world champion, and 2021 Olympian.

Medal record

World Championship

European Championship

Grand Prix

World Cup

References

External links

1990 births
Living people
French male épée fencers
World Fencing Championships medalists
Fencers at the 2020 Summer Olympics
Olympic fencers of France
21st-century French people